The Tour Percée double arch, also named the Tour Isabelle arch, is a double natural arch, located in the Parc Naturel Régional de la Chartreuse, Chartreuse Mountains, France.

It remained unknown for probably everybody, until its discovery in May 2005, when Pascal Sombardier, who was trekking to write his book Chartreuse inédite : Itinéraires insolites, dealing with lost places of the range, discovered it fortuitously. Its pictures illustrated the front cover of his book, published in 2006 : this double arch became then the symbol of the hidden treasures of the Chartreuse Mountains.

Located in a very remote area, with a difficult and dangerous access, very few guide books, even the most recent ones, mention its existence. The arch is located on private ground, and its owner fights visitors off.

References

Natural arches of France
Geography of Isère
Alps